Van Mahotsav or Vanamahotsava, is an annual one-week tree-planting festival in India which is celebrated in the first week of July.

History 
This is the  Indian national tree planting week was organized by Mohinder Singh Randhawa from 20 to 27 July 1947. Randhawa had been inspired by ideas of a forest week, the festival of trees, or arbor days in various countries. The first event of 20 July 1947 was inaugurated with the planting of Bauhinia saplings by Khurshid Ahmad Khan, commissioner of Delhi in the morning and the afternoon, another ceremony was held at the Purana Qila led by the Vice President of the Interim Government, Nehru. Another day was called Ladies Day and involved planting at the Qutub Minar with participants including Lady Mountbatten. Nehru said that It was a matter of surprise to him that so far no interest had been taken in tree plantation. Large tracts of the country had become deserts owing to the negligence of the people who cut trees without realizing their great value. There should be a law that no one should cut a tree unless he had first planted a new one in its place. Gandhi was in Delhi at the time and noted it in his prayer speech "The official who originated the idea of tree planting did not do it for fancy nor was it meant only for the monied men. It began with them so that others would copy them and thus add to the wealth and rainfall of India. Deforestation led to diminished rainfall. Moreover, trees required little care except in the early stages. An acre of land used for growing fruit trees would yield more fruit than a crop of wheat on the same area..." The tradition was continued and made into a national activity in 1950 by the Minister of Food and Agriculture Kanaiyalal Maneklal Munshi who moved it to the first week of July and renamed it as Van Mahotsav in 1950.

Aims
By encouraging Indians to support tree planting and tending, festival organizers hope to create more forests in the country.  It would provide alternative fuels, increase production of food resources, create shelter-belts around fields to increase productivity, provide food and shade for cattle, offer shade and decorative landscapes, reduce drought, and help to prevent soil erosion. The first week of July is just the right time for planting trees in most parts of India since it coincides with the monsoon.

References

Festivals in India
Environment of India
Forests of India
July observances